Kermani (also Romanized as Kermānī; also known as Kermānīyeh) is a village in Sabzdasht Rural District, in the Central District of Bafq County, Yazd Province, Iran. At the 2006 census, its population was 112, in 38 families.

References 

Populated places in Bafq County